Cooper Beebe (born May 19, 2001) is an American football offensive tackle who currently plays for the Kansas State Wildcats.

Early life and high school
Beebe grew up in Kansas City, Kansas and attended Piper High School. Beebe committed to play college football at Kansas State over an offer from Kansas and Minnesota.

College career
Beebe played in two games during his true freshman season at Kansas State while redshirting the season. He started eight games during his redshirt freshman season. Beebe started all 13 of the Wildcats' games in 2021 and was named first team All-Big 12 Conference.

References

External links
 Kansas State Wildcats bio

Living people
American football offensive tackles
Kansas State Wildcats football players
Players of American football from Kansas
2001 births